The 2009 Norwegian Football Cup was the 104th season of the Norwegian annual knockout football tournament. The competition started with two qualifying rounds on 13 April and 22 April, and the final was held on 8 November. The defending champions were Vålerenga.

The winners of the Cup, Aalesund, could call themselves Champions of Norway, and qualified for the third qualifying round of the 2010–11 UEFA Europa League.

Calendar

First round
The match-ups were selected by the association on 28 April, the matches were played on 9–10 May and 13 May.

|colspan="3" style="background-color:#97DEFF"|9 May 2009

|-
|colspan="3" style="background-color:#97DEFF"|10 May 2009

|-
|colspan="3" style="background-color:#97DEFF"|13 May 2009

|}

Second round
The match-ups were selected by the association on 14 May, the matches were played on 24 May, 27–28 May and 4 June.

|colspan="3" style="background-color:#97DEFF"|24 May 2009

|-
|colspan="3" style="background-color:#97DEFF"|27 May 2009

|-
|colspan="3" style="background-color:#97DEFF"|28 May 2009

|-
|colspan="3" style="background-color:#97DEFF"|4 June 2009

|-
|colspan="3" style="background-color:#97DEFF"|10 June 2009

|}

Third round
The match-ups were selected by the association on 5 June, the matches were played on 17–18 June.

|colspan="3" style="background-color:#97DEFF"|17 June 2009

|-
|colspan="3" style="background-color:#97DEFF"|18 June 2009

|}

Fourth round
This round consists of the 16 winners from the previous round. The eight matches will be played on 5, 8 and 9 July.

|colspan="3" style="background-color:#97DEFF"|5 July 2009

|-
|colspan="3" style="background-color:#97DEFF"|8 July 2009

|-
|colspan="3" style="background-color:#97DEFF"|9 July 2009

|}

Quarter-finals
The matches were played on 8–9 August.

Semi-finals
The matches were drawn on 10 August, with former Prime Minister, Kjell Magne Bondevik, drawing the first team. The team he drew were Molde, which is his favourite and hometown team. The matches are scheduled to be played on 23–24 September.

Final

References

External links
 Official website

 
Norwegian Football Cup seasons
Cup
Norway